Cydathenaeum or Kydathenaion was one of the demes in ancient Athens. It belonged in the phyle (tribe) Pandionis.

History
When Cleisthenes formally established the deme system in 508/7 BC, Kydathenaion was the third largest deme after Acharnae and Aphidna. Its population is estimated to have been around 3,300–3,600 people.

Kydathenaion was one of the five demes located within the walls of the city of Athens (alongside Koile, Kollytos, Melite, and Skambonidai).

Kydathenaion was in the very heart of Athens: it contained the Acropolis, and possibly the Areopagus.

Notable people from the deme include:
 Cleon (died 422 BC), statesman and a general during the Peloponnesian War
 Andocides (440–390 BC), one of the ten Attic orators
 Aristophanes (c. 446 – c. 386 BC), comic playwright
 Nicochares (died c. 345 BC), comic poet
 Echedemos (fl. 190 BC), statesman, ambassador
 Aristodemus of Cydathenaeum

Notes

References
 Luke Hendriks (2012). Athens and the Attic Demes. MA thesis, Leiden University.
 
 
 
 
 

Populated places in ancient Attica
Former populated places in Greece
Demoi